Pachyphytum hookeri is a species of plant in the genus Pachyphytum of the family Crassulaceae.

References

Crassulaceae
Taxa named by Joseph zu Salm-Reifferscheidt-Dyck
Taxa named by Alwin Berger